Edward "Ted" Carroll (born 11 July 1955) is a former Australian rules footballer who played with Footscray, Melbourne and Collingwood in the Victorian Football League (VFL). 

He later played in the Victorian Football Association for Springvale. He kicked 118 goals in the 1982 season, to be the VFA Division 2 leading goalkicker for the year.

Notes

External links 		
		
		
		
		
		
		
1955 births
Living people
Australian rules footballers from Victoria (Australia)		
Western Bulldogs players		
Melbourne Football Club players		
Collingwood Football Club players
Casey Demons players